Kabasele is a surname. Notable people with the surname include:

Christian Kabasele (born 1991), Belgian footballer
Nathan Kabasele (born 1994), Belgian footballer
Joseph Athanase Tshamala Kabasele  (1930-1983), known as Le Grand Kallé, musician, father of modern Congolese music, leader of  African Jazz